Meghann Michelle Haldeman is an American actress.

Haldeman had a role in 1991 TV movie Bad Attitudes, playing a rock & roller who communicates with hand gestures while listening to music through head phones. 

She was nominated for best juvenile actress for her participation in the series: Camp Wilder, where she played Melissa Wilder, a 13-year old being raised by her older sister after the death of her parents. The series ran from September 1992 to February 1993. From September 1993 until  June 1994 Haldeman played L'Amour Hart, the 15-year-old daughter of a would-be cowboy on Harts of the West. She played Neal Solomon, a 16-year old computer nerd, and daughter  of a judge, on The Home Court from September 1995 to June 1996.

References

Links 

 

Haldeman, Meghann
Living people
Year of birth missing (living people)
Place of birth missing (living people)
American child actresses
20th-century American actresses